The following is a list of spa towns in France.

Aix-en-Provence
Aix-les-Bains
Allevard
Amélie-les-Bains-Palalda
Amnéville
Ardèche
Aulus-les-Bains
Ax-les-Thermes
Bad Niederbronn
Bagnères-de-Bigorre
Bagnères-de-Luchon
Bagnoles
Bagnoles de l'Orne
Bagnols-les-Bains
Bains-les-Bains
Barbazan
Barbotan-les-Thermes
Bourbon-l'Archambault
Bourbon-Lancy
Bourbonne-les-Bains
Cambo-les-Bains
Challes-les-Eaux
Châteauneuf-les-Bains
Châtel-Guyon
Chaudes-Aigues
Contrexéville
Dax
Digne-les-Bains
Divonne-les-Bains
Eaux-Bonnes
Eaux-Chaudes
Enghien-les-Bains
Eugénie-les-Bains
Evaux-les-Bains
Évian-les-Bains
Jonzac
Latoue
La Bourboule
Le Boulou
Le Monêtier-les-Bains
Lons-le-Saunier
Luxeuil-les-Bains
Luz-Saint-Sauveur
Molitg-les-Bains
Mont-Dore
Néris-les-Bains
Plombières-les-Bains
Prats-de-Mollo-la-Preste
Rennes-les-Bains
Rochefort
Royat
Sail-les-Bains
Saint-Amand-les-Eaux
Saint-Lary-Soulan
Saint-Nectaire
Saint-Paul-lès-Dax
Salies-de-Béarn
Salies-du-Salat
Saujon
Thonon-les-Bains
Ussat
Uriage-les-Bains
Vals-les-Bains
Vernet-les-Bains
Vichy
Vittel

See also 
List of spa towns

 
Spa towns
France